Chenyang Town is a town and the county seat in the middle western Chenxi County, Hunan, China. Its seat of local government is at Sangmuqiao Community.

References

Chenxi County
County seats in Hunan